The 1985 Wimbledon Championships was a tennis tournament played on grass courts at the All England Lawn Tennis and Croquet Club in Wimbledon, London in the United Kingdom. It was the 99th edition of the Wimbledon Championships and were held from 24 June to 7 July 1985.

Prize money
The total prize money for 1985 championships was £1,934,760. The winner of the men's title earned £130,000 while the women's singles champion earned £117,000.

* per team

Champions

Seniors

Men's singles

 Boris Becker defeated  Kevin Curren, 6–3, 6–7(4–7), 7–6(7–3), 6–4
 It was Becker's 1st career Grand Slam title and his 1st Wimbledon title.

Women's singles

 Martina Navratilova defeated  Chris Evert Lloyd, 4–6, 6–3, 6–2
 It was Navratilova's 33rd career Grand Slam title and her 6th Wimbledon singles title.

Men's doubles

 Heinz Günthardt /  Balázs Taróczy defeated  Pat Cash /  John Fitzgerald, 6–4, 6–3, 4–6, 6–3
 It was Günthardt's 3rd career Grand Slam title and his only Wimbledon title. It was Taróczy's 2nd and last career Grand Slam title and his only Wimbledon title.

Women's doubles

 Kathy Jordan /  Elizabeth Smylie defeated  Martina Navratilova /  Pam Shriver, 5–7, 6–3, 6–4
 It was Jordan's 5th career Grand Slam title and her 2nd Wimbledon title. It was Smylie's 2nd career Grand Slam title and her 1st Wimbledon title.

Mixed doubles

 Paul McNamee /  Martina Navratilova defeated  John Fitzgerald /  Elizabeth Smylie, 7–5, 4–6, 6–2
 It was McNamee's 5th and last career Grand Slam title and his 3rd Wimbledon title. It was Navratilova's 34th career Grand Slam title and her 13th Wimbledon title.

Juniors

Boys' singles

 Leonardo Lavalle defeated  Eduardo Vélez, 6–4, 6–4

Girls' singles

 Andrea Holíková defeated  Jenny Byrne, 7–5, 6–1

Boys' doubles

 Agustín Moreno /  Jaime Yzaga defeated  Petr Korda /  Cyril Suk, 7–6(7–3), 6–4

Girls' doubles

 Louise Field /  Janine Thompson defeated  Elna Reinach /  Julie Richardson, 6–1, 6–2

Singles seeds

Men's singles
  John McEnroe (quarterfinals, lost to Kevin Curren)
  Ivan Lendl (fourth round, lost to Henri Leconte)
  Jimmy Connors (semifinals, lost to Kevin Curren)
  Mats Wilander (first round, lost to Slobodan Živojinović)
  Anders Järryd (semifinals, lost to Boris Becker)
  Pat Cash (second round, lost to Ricardo Acuña)
  Joakim Nyström (third round, lost to Boris Becker)
  Kevin Curren (final, lost to Boris Becker)
  Johan Kriek (third round, lost to Andreas Maurer)
  Aaron Krickstein (first round, lost to Bud Schultz)
  Yannick Noah (third round, lost to Vijay Amritraj)
  Miloslav Mečíř (first round, lost to Tom Gullikson)
  Eliot Teltscher (second round, lost to Henri Leconte)
  Stefan Edberg (fourth round, lost to Kevin Curren)
  Tomáš Šmíd (second round, lost to Sammy Giammalva)
  Tim Mayotte (fourth round, lost to Boris Becker)

Women's singles
  Chris Evert Lloyd (final, lost to Martina Navratilova) Martina Navratilova (champion)
 n/a
  Hana Mandlíková (third round, lost to Elizabeth Smylie)
  Manuela Maleeva (fourth round, lost to Molly Van Nostrand)
  Pam Shriver (quarterfinals, lost to Martina Navratilova)
  Claudia Kohde-Kilsch (second round, lost to Jo Durie)
  Helena Suková (quarterfinals, lost to Kathy Rinaldi)
  Zina Garrison (semifinals, lost to Martina Navratilova)
  Bonnie Gadusek (second round, lost to Anne Smith)
  Kathy Jordan (second round, lost to Larisa Savchenko)
  Steffi Graf (fourth round, lost to Pam Shriver)
  Catarina Lindqvist (first round, lost to Barbara Potter)
  Carling Bassett (second round, lost to Rene Uys)
  Wendy Turnbull (third round, lost to Pascale Paradis)
  Gabriela Sabatini (third round, lost to Catherine Tanvier)
  Kathy Rinaldi (semifinals, lost to Chris Evert Lloyd)

Notes

References

External links
 Official Wimbledon Championships website

 
Wimbledon Championships
Wimbledon Championships
Wimbledon Championships
Wimbledon Championships